Melastomataceae is a family of dicotyledonous flowering plants found mostly in the tropics (two-thirds of the genera are from the New World tropics) comprising c. 175 genera and c. 5115 known species. Melastomes are annual or perennial herbs, shrubs, or small trees.

Description
The leaves of melastomes are somewhat distinctive, being opposite, decussate, and usually with 3-7 longitudinal veins arising either from the base of the blade, plinerved (inner veins diverging above base of blade), or pinnately nerved with three or more pairs of primary veins diverging from the mid-vein at successive points above the base.

Flowers are perfect, and borne either singly or in terminal or axillary, paniculate cymes.

Ecology
A number of melastomes are regarded as invasive species once naturalized in tropical and subtropical environments outside their normal range. Examples are Koster's curse (Clidemia hirta), Pleroma semidecandrum and Miconia calvescens, but many other species are involved.

Taxonomy
Under the APG III system of classification, the seven genera from Memecylaceae are now included in this family.

Genera
There are some 175 accepted genera in the Melastomataceae family as of May 2022. They include:

Acanthella
Aciotis
Acisanthera
Adelobotrys
Allomaieta
Alloneuron
Amphiblemma
Amphorocalyx
Anaectocalyx
Anaheterotis
Andesanthus
Anerincleistus
Antherotoma
Appendicularia
Argyrella
Arthrostemma
Aschistanthera
Astrocalyx
Astronia
Astronidium
Axinaea
Barthea
Beccarianthus
Bellucia
Bertolonia
Bisglaziovia
Blakea
Blastus
Boerlagea
Boyania
Brachyotum
Brasilianthus
Bredia
Bucquetia
Cailliella
Calvoa
Calycogonium
Cambessedesia
Castratella
Catanthera
Catocoryne
Centradenia
Centradeniastrum
Centronia
Chaetogastra
Chaetolepis
Chaetostoma
Chalybea
Charianthus
Cincinnobotrys
Clidemia
Comolia
Comoliopsis
Conostegia
Creochiton
Cyphotheca
Derosiphia
Desmoscelis
Dicellandra
Dichaetanthera
Dinophora
Dionycha
Dionychastrum
Dissochaeta
Dissotidendron
Dissotis
Driessenia
Dupineta
Eriocnema
Ernestia
Feliciadamia
Fordiophyton
Fritzschia
Graffenrieda
Gravesia
Guyonia
Henriettea
Heteroblemma
Heterocentron
Heterotis
Huberia
Kendrickia
Kerriothyrsus
Kirkbridea
Lavoisiera
Leandra
Lijndenia
Lithobium
Loricalepis
Macairea
Macrocentrum
Macrolenes
Maguireanthus
Maieta
Mallophyton
Marcetia
Mecranium
Medinilla
Melastoma
†Melastomites
Melastomastrum
Memecylon
Meriania
Merianthera
Miconia
Microlicia
Monochaetum
Monolena
Mouriri
Neblinanthera
Necramium
Neodriessenia
Nepsera
Nerophila
Noterophila {Wikispecies)
Nothodissotis
Ochthephilus
Ochthocharis
Opisthocentra
Osbeckia
Ossaea
Oxyspora
Pachyanthus
Pachycentria
Pachyloma
Phainantha
Phyllagathis
Physeterostemon
Pilocosta
Plagiopetalum
Pleiochiton
Pleroma
Plethiandra
Poikilogyne
Poilannammia
Poteranthera
Preussiella
Pseudodissochaeta
Pseudoernestia
Pternandra
Pterogastra
Pterolepis
Quipuanthus
Rhexia
Rhynchanthera
Rostranthera
Rousseauxia
Sagraea
Salpinga
Sandemania
Sarcopyramis
Schwackaea
Scorpiothyrsus
Siphanthera
Sonerila
Spathandra
Sporoxeia
Stanmarkia
Stenodon
Stussenia
Styrophyton
Tashiroea
Tateanthus
Tessmannianthus
Tetrazygia
Tibouchina
Tigridiopalma
Tococa
Trembleya
Triolena
Tristemma
Tryssophyton
Vietsenia
Votomita
Warneckea
Wurdastom

Foraging 

Melastomataceae is foraged by many stingless bees, especially by the species Melipona bicolor which gather pollen from this taxon of flowering plant.

References

External links

PlantSystematics.org: Images of species, list of genera
 

 
Myrtales families